Bommai Kalyanam (colloquially: Fake wedding)  is a 1958 Indian Tamil-language romantic drama film, directed by R. M. Krishnaswamy. The film stars Sivaji Ganesan, Jamuna and Mynavathi. It was simultaneously produced in Telugu as Bommala Pelli.

Plot 
Kannan is a playful teenage boy, in the cusp between puberty and adolescent, the son of the famous and well-to-do lawyer Varadarajan and Thangam. While playing football, he meets Radha, the daughter of a well respected freedom fighter family of Veeramuthu and Maragatham. At first sight both fall in love.

Varadarajan is a modest man, but Thangam is a greedy woman. Thangam wishes to marry off Kannan to her brother Sonachalam's and Perundhevi couple's daughter Kannamma and invites them to her place. Kannamma is a naïve girl and Mannar, Perundhevi's brother loves her. Varadarajan likes the simplicity of Veeramuthu's family and agrees on the alliance of Kannan and Radha. When Thangam opposes this, Varadarajan, in order to carry on with the wedding, lies to her that Veeramuthu will present a large dowry. The wedding takes place.

After the wedding, Perundhevi, who is furious that Kannamma is not the bride, instigates Thangam to query regarding the dowry. A scuffle takes place between the two families and Thangam wishes to send back Radha to her parents place, but Kannan sides with Radha and accepts her whole-heartedly. Meanwhile, Sonachalam wishes to leave home, but Perundhevi, who is in agony, decides to stay back and plans to create hatred between Thangam and Radha. In turn, Thangam tortures Radha in every possible way, but Radha fights back and keeps calm. Matters get worse when Varadarajan dies, but not before seeking a promise from Kannan not to disobey Thangam. Kannan and Radha's marriage life hits a roadblock. When coming to know that Thangam treats Radha very badly, Veeramuthu steps in and takes Radha, who is driven away by both Thangam and Perundevi, away to his place.

When Kanna comes back, Thangam and Perundevi lie to him that Radha had gone to her parents place along with Veeramuthu, without seeking their consent. That night, Radha tries to meet Kannan, but Thangam would not let Radha in. Meanwhile, Kannamma unwittingly lets know Kannan regarding this incident and Kannan goes to Veeramuthu's place to explain, in order to take back Radha. Veeramuthu spells out to Kannan clearly that Radha would not go to Kannan's place as long as Thangam is there. Taking this opportunity, Thangam and Peundhevi force and arrange Kannamma to be married to Kannan. Observing all this, Sonachalam and Mannar attempt to abduct Kannamma, but fail. To make matters worse, Thangam sends a letter to Radha informing that Kannan would remarry and restricts Radha not to interfere in Kannan's life any more.

On the engagement day, Kannan who is badly disturbed by the events, falls from the first floor of his balcony and is badly injured. Upon hearing this, Radha rushes to Kannan's place, was stopped by Veeramuthu, but later consents after hearing to Radha's plea. Kannan is happy to see Radha around, tells her not to leave him even though Thangam mistreats her and Radha assures this. At this juncture, Thangam and Perundevi further humiliate Veeramuthu to the worst, which drives him to sell his mansion to compensate with much dowry. Thangam tries all her best to drive Radha away, but to no avail and she becomes violent. Radha hides in one of the rooms, but Thangam tries to force open the door, when the door collapse onto Thangam. At the same time, Veeramuthu parades the dowry items from his home throughout the streets, much to the residents' dismay and reaches Kannan's place. Upon seeing all this, Perundevi and Kannamma flee.

Thangam realises her error on her deathbed and seeks apology from Kannan, Radha and Veeramuthu then dies. Kannan and Radha reunite and live happily.

Cast 
Sivaji Ganesan as Kannan
Jamuna as Radha
Mynavathi as Kannamma
V. Nagayya as Varatharajan
S. V. Ranga Rao as Veeramuthu
Santha Kumari as Thangam
Rushyendramani as Maragatham
Friend Ramasamy as Sonachalam
Kaka Radhakrishnan as Mannar
M. S. Sundari Bai as Perundevi

Soundtrack 
Tamil songs
The music was composed by K. V. Mahadevan. Lyrics were by Udumalai Narayana Kavi & A. Maruthakasi. The song "Nillu Nillu Megame" by P. Susheela, K. Jamuna Rani & Group  did not take place in this film.

Telugu songs
All the tunes for all the songs for both languages are the same.

Lyrics were by Acharya Aatreya.

Reception 
Bommai Kalyanam was panned by Kanthan of Kalki, and ran for 50 days in theatres. Bommala Pelli fared slightly better.

References

External links 
 

1950s Tamil-language films
1950s Telugu-language films
1958 films
Films scored by K. V. Mahadevan